N'Ze may refer to:

 Marcus N'Ze, a footballer from Ghana
 Desmond N'Ze, a footballer from Ghana

See also 
 Nze (disambiguation)
 Nzé (disambiguation)
 NZE (disambiguation)